The Baynes Hydroelectric Power Station is a planned  hydroelectric power plant in northwest Namibia, at the border with Angola.

Location

The dam and power station would sit astride the border between Angola and Namibia.

Overview
Before 2005, NamPower, the electricity supply parastatal in Namibia, maintained a Firm Power Contract (FPC) with Eskom of South Africa. That year, the contract expired and could not be renewed because South Africa was having a power shortage of its own. Joint feasibility studies, environmental and resettlement assessments, selected the present location, because it was the least disruptive to the environment and to the lives of the indigenous communities. The governments of Angola and Namibia decided to build a 600 megawatt power station and share the energy equally.

Technical details
The dam consists of a rock fill embankment with a concrete face. The rock fill will be . Power will be generated by five Francis-type Vertical Axis turbines. Two turbines will each have capacity of 71 megawatts and three with 156.75 megawatts capacity each.

Construction
The construction budget has been calculated at US$1.2 billion. Construction is planned to start in 2021 and conclude in 2025. After completion, Angola and Namibia are expected to utilize 300 megawatts each. In April 2020, that timeline was pushed back; with construction starting in 2023 and commissioning in 2029.

See also

 List of power stations in Angola
 List of power stations in Namibia

References

External links
Hydropower & Dams: Namibia Country Profile
Kunene River Awareness Kit As of 2010.

Dams in Angola
Dams in Namibia
Underground power stations
Hydroelectric power stations in Angola
Hydroelectric power stations in Namibia
Proposed renewable energy power stations in Angola
Proposed renewable energy power stations in Namibia